The Beresford, later Beresford-Peirse Baronetcy, of Bagnall in the County of Waterford, is a title in the Baronetage of the United Kingdom. It was created on 21 May 1814 for John Beresford. He was an admiral in the Royal Navy and also represented Coleraine, Berwick-on-Tweed, Northallerton and Chatham in the House of Commons.

Beresford was the illegitimate son of George Beresford, 1st Marquess of Waterford, and the brother of William Beresford, 1st Viscount Beresford. He was succeeded by his son, the second Baronet, from his first marriage to Mary Molloy. He died without surviving male issue and was succeeded by his nephew, the third Baronet. He was the eldest son of Henry William de la Poer Beresford-Peirse (1820–1859), eldest son of the first Baronet's second marriage to Harriett Elizabeth, daughter of Henry Peirse. He served as Chairman of the North Riding of Yorkshire County Council. His grandson, the fifth Baronet, was Director-General of the Forestry Commission between 1962 and 1968. As of 2022 the title is held by the latter's grandson, the seventh Baronet, who succeeded his father in 2013.

Beresford, later Beresford-Peirse baronets, of Bagnall (1814)
Sir John  Beresford, 1st Baronet (1766–1844)
Sir George de la Poer Beresford, 2nd Baronet (1811–1873)
Sir Henry Monson de la Poer Beresford-Peirse, 3rd Baronet (1850–1926)
Sir Henry Bernard de la Poer Beresford-Peirse, 4th Baronet (1875–1949)
Sir Henry Campbell de la Poer Beresford-Pierse, 5th Baronet (1905–1972)
Sir Henry Grant de la Poer Beresford-Peirse, 6th Baronet (1933–2013)
Sir Henry Njers de la Poer Beresford-Peirse, 7th Baronet (born 1969)

The heir apparent is the present holder's son, Harry Tamlyn de la Poer Beresford-Peirse (born 2007).

See also
Marquess of Waterford
Viscount Beresford
Noel Beresford-Peirse

Notes

Beresford-Peirse
Beresford family